Boris Georgievich Kuznetsov, 23 February 1947 – 3 May 2006) was a Russian featherweight boxer. He won a gold medal at the 1972 Olympics and a silver medal at the 1974 World Championships. Domestically he won the Soviet featherweight title in 1972 and 1974 and placed second in 1970 and 1971. During his career he won 237 fights out of 249. He became the Honoured Master of Sports of the USSR in 1972 and was awarded the Order of the Badge of Honor in the same year. He graduated from Astrakhan State Pedagogical Institute in 1971 and later opened a boxing school in Astrakhan.

References

1947 births
2006 deaths
Soviet male boxers
Olympic boxers of the Soviet Union
Sportspeople from Astrakhan
Boxers at the 1972 Summer Olympics
Olympic gold medalists for the Soviet Union
Honoured Masters of Sport of the USSR
Olympic medalists in boxing
Russian male boxers
AIBA World Boxing Championships medalists
Medalists at the 1972 Summer Olympics
Featherweight boxers